is a family of Mexican music styles. The word likely derives from the Nahuatl word  that literally means 'on top of the wood', alluding to a wooden platform on which dancers perform  dance steps.

()

The classical  is characterized by a complex rhythmic structure mixing duple and triple metres which reflect the intricate steps of the dance. The  is danced by men and women as couples.

Huapango arribeño or son arribeño is a style of music played in the "zona media" region (part of San Luis Potosi, Queretaro and Guanajuato). Traditionally it is played using four instruments (jarana huasteca, huapanguera and two violins). The lyrics are mostly improvised and sung in the style of décimas, or versed poems. Guillermo Velázquez is a popular musician of the style.

This dance style and rhythm was included in early . The instrumentation of this type of ensemble consists of accordion, double bass, drums and saxophone.

Both major and minor keys are used. One of the distinctive characteristics is the use of a falsetto by the vocalist. Another characteristic is the use of busy violin passages for the musical introductions and interludes. Famous songs include "" and "".

by Moncayo
The  is classical piece composed by José Pablo Moncayo using as inspiration several son jarocho songs. The song is not inspired by Huapango music, but probably is more related to the origin of the word, which refers to dancing on wooden pallets.

See also
 Folk dance of Mexico

Regional styles of Mexican music
Mexican styles of music
Latin American folk dances